Haiphong Football Club, simply known as Haiphong, is a Vietnamese professional football club based in Haiphong. Haiphong is one of the most successful football teams in Vietnam with 13 major titles. They are currently playing in V.League 1 as their home ground is Lạch Tray Stadium.

The predecessor of the club is considered to have originated from the Hai Phong Police Football Team. This is the only team of the city "Flamboyant flowers" survived after the subsidy was removed while a series of other strong port city dissolved as Hai Phong Power, Hai Phong Port, or Previously Hai Phong Cement.

History
In 1906, football was brought to North Vietnam by the French, Hai Phong at that time was one of the first localities to have football clubs including Olympique Haiphong, Arrow (La Flèche)., High School (Radium), Youth of Tonkin (La Jeunesse Tonkinoise) and The Sea Golden Elephant (Voi Vàng Đất Cảng). At that time, it was mentioned that in 1909 two Haiphong teams include Le Duong Dap Cau (Legion Dap Cau) and Olympique Haiphong faced each other. In the first leg, Olympique Hai Phong won 2-1 but the second match lost 1-8. Decades in the 30s, Hai Phong football was famous for the pair Nguyen Lan and Nguyen Thong, whose brought much success to the team, but all 5 teams were disbanded after the Vietnamese August Revolution of 1945. 
Therefore, the forerunner of the club is considered from the football team Hai Phong Police Football Team.

The team was founded in 1952, won 10 times the North A division as well as 2 times the National Cup and the men's football championship of the Congress. National gymnastics and sports 3 times as well as 2 times SKDA champion and 2 times 1st Division champion. Referring to the club, it is impossible not to mention the names that make the team's history such as: Dang Van Dung, Dinh The Nam, Nguyen Trong Dan, Vu Trong Ha, Nguyen Trung Dung, Tran Binh Su, Chu Van Mui, Nguyen Trong Lo, Nguyen Trong Dan, Nguyen Thanh Kiem, Nguyen Van Giai, Tran Thai Bao, Vu Song Thao. However, this is the only team of the city "Red phoenix flower" that survived after the subsidy was abolished while a series of other strong teams of the port city were dissolved such as Hai Phong Electricity (dissolved 1992), Hai Phong Port (dissolved in 1991), Cam River Chemical, Military Zone 3 or before that Hai Phong Cement (later renamed Hai Phong Construction Workers).

After the 2001–02 season, when again to play in the First Division, found no longer suitable for the new professional football was built in Vietnam, Hai Phong Police Department has decided to transfer the team. About the Sports Department of Hai Phong City. In the early years under the management of the Department of Sports and Recreation, the leadership selected the model combined with a business sponsor, the team in turn named pair with Vietnam Australia, Mitsustar Haier and Van Hoa. But this model is not very successful, the team continues to swing between professional and first-class.

On 16 October 2007, Hai Phong Department of Physical Training and Sports assigned Hai Phong Cement Company to manage and operate. The club was renamed Haiphong Cement, causing a slight confusion with a company of the same name that existed before the company during the subsidy period.

After being transferred to Hai Phong Cement Management, the club immediately competed in the first season back to the V-League and won third place in the National Football Championship five 2008 under the direction of coach Vuong Tien Dung. In the following season, the team marked two milestones for the development of Vietnamese football as it succeeded in signing Brazilian former World Cup 2002 winner Denílson to compete for the title. team in the second phase V-League 2009. This is the most famous player in the competition in Vietnam up to that time.  The second is Hai Phong football fan club officially became the first fan club of Vietnam was established by the decision of the People's Committee of the city, has the legal status, seal and account private.

Beginning in the 2011 V-League season, Haiphong Cement was renamed Vicem Hai Phong by the club with the new sponsor of the Vietnam Cement Industry Corporation.

At the end of the 2012 V-League season, the team was worse at the bottom of the table, having to play in the First Division of the 2013 season. However, the team bought back the Khanh Hoa Football Club V-League should continue to play in V-League 2013.

In 2014, the host unit Vicem paid the club back to the city, the team changed its name to Hai Phong Football Club. Despite the lack of financial strength as the cement season, the team has a better result than before: the 2014 national cup champion, by 2015 had the time leading the V-League rankings.

In 2016, Hai Phong club, although not highly regarded, has led the V League for most of the season. Notably, the series won seven consecutive games in the first seven rounds of the tournament. Unfortunately, due to shortness of breath in the last rounds. Hanoi T&T won the championship with a regrettable score and lost only the secondary. Anyhow, the club has a successful season beyond expectations.

In 2017, the team was stable and finished in seventh place overall

In 2018, the team sometimes participated in the race for the championship, but at the end of the season, the team could not maintain stability when it reached the 6th place. This is the last season for the Vietnamese team goalkeeper Dang Van Lam for the club and he helped the club receive the fewest goals conceded with 26 goals. He then moved to Thailand to play for Muangthong United Club

In 2019, the team finished in 12th place overall. This is a successful debut season for young goalkeeper Nguyen Van Toan for the club when he was summoned to the Vietnam team to attend the King's Cup 2019 in Thailand and was called up to the U23 Vietnam team to attend the Sea Games 30 in the Philippines and won the men's gold medal in men's soccer overall. This is also the last season of coach Truong Viet Hoang to lead the club after 5 years of attachment and many of the team's emperors departed, most notably the Jamaican foreign couple Andre Fagan and Jermie Lynch for Than Quang Ninh

In 2020, the team brought new coach Pham Anh Tuan from Song Lam Nghe An club and Vietnamese player Martin Lo from Pho Hien FC. 

In 2022, the team brought in Chu Dinh Nghiem, former Hanoi FC coach

Name 
 Haiphong Police (1952–2002)
 Haiphong Vietnam - Australia steel (2002–2004)
 Mitsustar Haiphong (2005)
 Mitsustar Haier Haiphong (2006)
 Van Hoa Hai Phong (2007)
 Haiphong Cement (2008–2010)
 Vicem Haiphong (2011–2012)
 Cement Vicem Haiphong (2013)
 Haiphong Football Club (2014–present)

Stadium 
The Lạch Tray Stadium is a multi-use stadium in Hai Phong, Vietnam. It is currently used mostly for football matches and is the home stadium of Hải Phòng F.C. of the V.League 1. The stadium holds 30,000 spectators.

Kit suppliers and shirt sponsors

Honours

National competitions
League
V.League 1/ A1 National League/ Hoa Binh League
 Winners (10) :1957, 1959, 1960, 1961, 1963, 1965, 1966, 1967, 1968, 1970 
 Runners-up : 1992, 2010, 2016,  2022
V.League 2:
Winners (2) : 1995, 2003
 Runners-up : 2007
Cup
Vietnamese National Cup:
 Winners (2):  1995, 2014
 Runners-up : 2005
Vietnamese Super Cup:
 Winners :   2005
 Runners-up : 2014, 2022

Other competitions
Festival Sport Vietnam:
Winners(3):1985, 1990, 1995
Hoa Lư Cup:
 Winners :   2022

Performance in AFC competitions
 Asian Cup Winners' Cup: 1 appearance
1996–97: Second round

1 Lam Pak withdrew before 1st leg

Record as V.League 1 member

Current squad
As of 17 January 2023

Reserve squad

Head coaching history

 1952–1968:  Nguyễn Lan
 1968–1974:  Nguyễn Trọng Lộ
 1974–1992: --unknown--
 1992–1998:  Trần Bình Sự
 1998–2001:  Mai Trần Hải
 2001–2004:  Trần Văn Phúc
 2005–2005:  Luis Alberto
 2007–2007:  Laszlo Kleber
 2007–2007:  Luis Alberto
 2007–2008:  Vương Tiến Dũng
 2008–2009:  Alfred Riedl
 2009–2009:  Đinh Thế Nam
 2009–2011:  Vương Tiến Dũng
 2011–2012:  Nguyễn Đình Hưng
 2012–2012:  Lê Thụy Hải
 2013–2014:  Hoàng Anh Tuấn
 2014–2014:  Dylan Kerr
 2014–2019:  Trương Việt Hoàng
 2019–2022:  Phạm Anh Tuấn
 2022–present:  Chu Dinh Nghiem

References

External links

Football clubs in Vietnam
Haiphong
Police association football clubs in Vietnam
Haiphong FC